Acharia may refer to:

 Acharia, Georgia
 Acharia (moth), a genus of moths in the family Limacodidae
 Acharia (plant), a genus of flowering plants in the family Achariaceae
 Basudeb Acharia (born 1942), Indian politician

See also
Acharya

Genus disambiguation pages